George W. Gardner (1834–1911) was the 28th and 30th mayor of Cleveland. A Republican, he served from both 1885–1886, and 1889–1890.

Early life
Gardner was born on February 7, 1834, in Pittsfield, Massachusetts, to Colonel James and Griselda Porter Gardner. His father was a manufacturer of furniture. His grandmother was Eunice Yale of the Yale family, while his great-grandmother was Rachel Adams of Quincy, descendant of Henry Adams. The Yale family is famous for having given their name to Yale University, while the Adams family is known for the two US Presidents they have produced. In 1858, he married Rosaline Lucretia Oviatt, daughter of General Orson M. Oviatt and Lucretia Wood. In 1837, his family moved to Cleveland.

Career

Politics
Gardner was an active Republican politician, serving as a city councilman from 1863 to 1864 and 1876–1881. He served as the mayor of Cleveland for two non-consecutive two-year terms, from 1885 to 1886, and later 1889–1890. In 1886, he established Cleveland's Civil Service.

He was also a large dealer in grain and flour, and became President of the City Council of Cleveland, as well as President of the Board of Trustees of the Ohio Reform School.

Personal life and death
In 1879, Gardner became a founding member of the Cleveland Yacht Club. He died in Dayton, Ohio on December 18, 1911. He was buried at the Woodland Cemetery in Cleveland.

References

Further reading 
 

Mayors of Cleveland
1830 births
1906 deaths
People from Adams, New York